

Buildings and structures

Buildings
 Great Ziggurat of Ur constructed

See also 
21st century BC
Timeline of architecture

References

Architecture